Cotton Street runs along the south side of Downtown Shreveport. One of the oldest gay bars in Louisiana, the Korner Lounge, has been continuously operating since the late 1930s at the corner of Cotton and Louisiana Avenue. On Marshall Street near the terminus of Cotton Street is the largest of Shreveport's gay and lesbian bars, Central Station. This club is located in the Central Railroad Station of Shreveport, built in 1909, and features a country and western bar, a dance club, a video bar, and a drag queen showroom upstairs.

External links
Shreveport Philadelphia Center - HIV/GLBT Center
P.A.C.E. - Shreveport (Political Action Council for Equality)
Gay & Lesbian Outreach at Centenary College
Robinson Film Center (features GLBT movies)

Gay villages in the United States
Geography of Shreveport, Louisiana